The Côte d'Ivoire Championnat D3 is the third tier of Ivoirian Football.

The following 38 clubs will compete in the Championnat Division 3 during the 2012-13 season.

Members for 2012–13

Poule A

Source:

Poule B

Source:

Poule C

Source:

Poule D

Source:

External links
Fédération Ivoirienne de Football

3
Ivory